Wenchi is one of the constituencies represented in the Parliament of Ghana. It elects one Member of Parliament (MP) by the first past the post system of election.

Haruna Seidu is the member of parliament for the constituency. He was elected on the ticket of the party National Democratic Congress.

See also
List of Ghana Parliament constituencies

References 

Parliamentary constituencies in the Bono Region